is a Japanese long-distance runner who competes in marathon races. Nogami took second at the 2015 Gold Coast Marathon, losing first place to Risa Takenaka and defeating third place finisher Manami Kamitanida.

References

External links

Living people
Japanese female long-distance runners
Japanese female marathon runners
1985 births
Athletes (track and field) at the 2018 Asian Games
Asian Games silver medalists for Japan
Asian Games medalists in athletics (track and field)
Medalists at the 2018 Asian Games
20th-century Japanese women
21st-century Japanese women